Blue Thunder is a 1983 American action thriller film from Columbia Pictures, produced by Gordon Carroll, Phil Feldman, and Andrew Fogelson and directed by John Badham.

The Blue Thunder helicopter itself did exist as two copies of modified French helicopter "Aérospatiale Gazelle", on which the cockpit was installed in the style of AH-64.

A spin-off television series, also called Blue Thunder, ran for 11 episodes in 1984.

Plot
Frank Murphy is a Metropolitan Police Department air support division pilot and troubled Vietnam War veteran with post traumatic stress disorder (PTSD). His newly assigned observer is novice Richard Lymangood. The two patrol Los Angeles at night and give assistance to police forces on the ground.

Murphy is instructed to attend a sunrise demonstration in the Mojave Desert at "Pinkville" and is selected to pilot an advanced helicopter, informally called "The Special"  and nicknamed "Blue Thunder", during an evaluation exercise. It is a military-style combat aircraft intended for police use in surveillance and against possible large-scale civic disobedience during the 1984 Summer Olympics. With powerful armament, and other accoutrements such as thermal infrared scanners, unidirectional microphones and cameras, built-in mobile telephone, computer and modem, and a U-Matic Video Cassette Recorder, Blue Thunder appears to be a formidable tool in the war on crime. Murphy notes wryly that with enough of these helicopters "you could run the whole damn country."

When the death of city councilwoman Diana McNeely turns out to be more than just a random murder, Murphy begins his own covert investigation. He discovers that a subversive action group is intending instead to use Blue Thunder in a military role to quell disorder under the project codename T.H.O.R. ("Tactical Helicopter Offensive Response"), and is secretly eliminating political opponents to advance its agenda.

Murphy suspects the involvement of his old wartime nemesis, former United States Army Colonel F.E. Cochrane, the primary test pilot for Blue Thunder and someone who felt Murphy was "unsuitable" for the program. Murphy and Lymangood use Blue Thunder to record a meeting between Cochrane and the other government officials which would implicate them in the conspiracy, but Cochrane looks outside and sees Blue Thunder and realizes what has happened. After landing, Lymangood secures the tape and hides it, but is captured upon returning to his home, interrogated, and then killed while trying to escape. Murphy hijacks Blue Thunder and arranges to have his girlfriend Kate retrieve the tape and deliver it to the local news station, using the helicopter to thwart her pursuers. Kate arrives at the news station, but is almost captured by one of the conspirators; the reporter Kate was sent to find intercepts Kate and gets the tape back, while the conspirator is knocked unconscious by a security guard.

With the force of the city on their side, due to Murphy having hijacked Blue Thunder and being deemed a "security risk", Cochrane and the other conspirators employ every asset they can manage to bring Blue Thunder down, beginning with two LAPD Bell 206s. After Murphy incapacitates the first one, forcing it to land via autorotation, he engages in a   cat and mouse with the second by slaloming down the Los Angeles River viaduct until his pursuer crashes. Following this, two Air National Guard F-16 fighters are deployed to deal with Murphy, but he manages to shoot one of them down and evade the other. In the process, one missile destroys a barbecue stand in Little Tokyo and a second hits ARCO Plaza. The operation is suspended by the mayor. Cochrane, bent on revenge and finally putting down his former subordinate from Vietnam, disobeys orders to stand down and ambushes Blue Thunder in a heavily armed Hughes 500 helicopter. After a tense battle, Murphy is able to shoot Cochrane down after executing a 360° loop through use of Blue Thunder turbine boost function. Murphy then destroys Blue Thunder by landing it in front of an approaching freight train.

In the meantime, the tape is made public and, as a result, the conspirators are arrested.

Cast

 Roy Scheider as Murphy
 Warren Oates as Braddock
 Candy Clark as Kate
 Daniel Stern as Lymangood
 Malcolm McDowell as Cochrane
 Paul Roebling as Icelan 
 David Sheiner as Fletcher 
 Joe Santos as Montoya

Production
Co-writers Dan O'Bannon and Don Jakoby began developing the plot while living together in a Hollywood apartment in the late 1970s, where low-flying police helicopters woke them on a regular basis. Their original script was a more political one, attacking the concept of a police state controlling the population through high-tech surveillance and heavy armament. They sought and received extensive script help from Captain Bob Woods, then-chief of the LAPD's Air Support Division. The first draft of the screenplay for Blue Thunder was written in 1979 and featured Frank Murphy as more of a crazy main character with deeper psychological issues, who went on a rampage and destroyed much of Los Angeles before finally falling to F-16s.

The script was rewritten by American screenwriter Dean Riesner with directions on the style of dialogue from director John Badham.

Filmed on location in Los Angeles beginning in the late months of 1981, Blue Thunder was one of Warren Oates' last films before his death on April 3, 1982, which occurred during post-production, and the film is dedicated to him. He made one movie and one TV episode before and after filming during 1981–1982 that were released after Blue Thunder.

Although the film was shot in Los Angeles and real-life neighborhoods are mentioned, the LAPD did not allow any references to be made to them. Hence, the police force is known as the more-generic "Metropolitan Police" and Frank Murphy is part of the fictional "ASTRO Division", rather than the real-life "Air Support Division". However, Air Support assignments are often known as ASTRO, or "Air Support to Regular Operations".

The LAPD Hooper Heliport, which was still under construction at the time, filled in as the home base for the fictional version of the police air unit. The drive-in theater scene where Frank's girlfriend Kate recovers the tape was filmed at the Pickwick Theatre in Burbank, California; the theater has since then been demolished and replaced by a Pavilions supermarket.

Malcolm McDowell, who portrayed antagonist F. E. Cochrane, was intensely afraid of flying, and not even his then-wife Mary Steenburgen could persuade him to overcome his phobia. In an interview for Starlog in 1983, Badham recalled, "He was terrified. He used to get out and throw up after a flight." McDowell's grimaces and discomfort can be seen during the climactic battle between Murphy and Cochrane in the film. Steenburgen commented to filmmakers afterward, "I don't know how you got him up there, I can't even get him in a 747!"

Blue Thunder helicopter

Designer Mickey Michaels created the helicopters used in the film after reviewing and rejecting various existing designs. The helicopters used for Blue Thunder were French built Aérospatiale SA-341G Gazelles modified with bolt-on parts and Apache-style canopies. Two modified Gazelle helicopters, a Hughes 500 helicopter, and two radio-controlled F-16 fighter models were used in the filming of the movie. The helicopters were purchased from Aérospatiale by Columbia Pictures for $190,000 each and flown to Cinema Air in Carlsbad, California where they were heavily modified for the film. These alterations made the helicopters so heavy that various tricks had to be employed to make it look fast and agile in the film. For instance, the 360° loop maneuver Murphy performs at the end of the film, which catches Cochrane so completely by surprise that he is easily shot down by Murphy's gunfire and killed, was carried out by a radio controlled model.

Reception

Box office
Blue Thunder was released on May 13, 1983. It was the number 1 ranked film in the United States on its opening weekend, taking in $8,258,149 at 1,539 theaters, overtaking the previous number 1 film Flashdance. The film was ranked No. 2 in its second and third weekends. Overall, in the US, it took in $42,313,354 for its 66 days of release. Blue Thunder was released in West Germany on February 5, 1983, before its US release, being released worldwide between June and September 1983. Its UK release was August 25, 1983. It was released in East Germany and South Korea in 1984. Its total international box office income is unreported. The film made $21.9 million in video rentals in the US.

Critical response
 On Metacritic it has a score of 66% based on reviews from 11 critics, indicating "generally favorable reviews."

Variety called it "a ripsnorting live-action cartoon, utterly implausible but no less enjoyable for that". Rita Kempley of The Washington Post wrote: "Blue Thunder hovers just this side of trash and the other side of credibility, but it propels a willing audience into adrenaline heaven."
Vincent Canby of The New York Times wrote: "The action sequences are what the film is all about, and these are remarkably well done, including a climactic, largely bloodless shootout among helicopters and jet fighters over Los Angeles."

C.J. Henderson reviewed Blue Thunder in The Space Gamer No. 63. Henderson commented that "Blue Thunder is this year's must-see action film. See it."

Christopher John reviewed Blue Thunder in Ares Magazine #14 and commented that "For those who want a film that is both filled with action and thought provoking, Blue Thunder is a sure bet. Watch out, George, the Jedi have competition."

Cultural references
An acronym used in the film, "JAFO", meaning "Just Another Fucking Observer", is police community jargon and is mentioned repeatedly in the film in reference to any police helicopter's non-pilot second officer, in this case Daniel Stern's character of Richard Lymangood. In the related TV series, the reference is expurgated as "Just Another Frustrated Observer".

A screen still from Blue Thunder of the helicopter flying in front of the Los Angeles skyline is used as the background image of the title screen in the Sega 1987 video game Thunder Blade.

Video game
In 1987, Coca-Cola Telecommunications released a Blue Thunder video tape cartridge for Worlds of Wonder's short lived Action Max game system.  Using footage from the film, the player plays the pilot of the Blue Thunder helicopter as he tries to prevent the World Peace Coalition from being attacked by a terrorist organization.

Remake
In 2015, Sony proposed a remake of Blue Thunder focusing on drone technology, with Dana Brunetti and Michael De Luca as producers, and Craig Kyle as writer. In 2017, it was announced that Columbia Pictures would be overseeing the remake.

See also
 Blue Thunder (TV series)
 List of films featuring surveillance
 Airwolf
 List of American films of 1983
 Thunder Blade

References

Citations

Bibliography

 Farmer, James H. (1984). Broken Wings: Hollywood's Air Crashes. Missoula, Montana: Pictorial Histories Pub Co. .

External links
 
 
 
  (TV series)
  (Video game)
 1987 Action Max "Blue Thunder" Game Video on YouTube

1983 films
1983 action thriller films
American action thriller films
American police detective films
American aviation films
Columbia Pictures films
Films adapted into television shows
Films directed by John Badham
Films produced by Gordon Carroll
Films scored by Arthur B. Rubinstein
Films set in 1983
Films set in Los Angeles
Films shot in Los Angeles
Films set in California
Films shot in California
Films shot in Burbank, California
Fictional portrayals of the Los Angeles Police Department
Films with screenplays by Dan O'Bannon
1980s American films